Caribou Mountains are a mountain range in the Rocky Mountains  in Idaho, United States.
The mountains are in the Caribou National Forest in Bonneville and Caribou counties, near the Wyoming border.

Named for Cariboo Fairchild, a prospector who had taken part in the gold rush in the Cariboo region of British Columbia in 1860. Fairchild discovered gold in this area of present-day eastern Idaho two years later.

The highest point of the range is 9,803-foot Caribou Mountain.

References

Mountain ranges of Idaho
Landforms of Bonneville County, Idaho
Landforms of Caribou County, Idaho